Anax walsinghami is a species of dragonfly in the family Aeshnidae (darners), in the suborder Anisoptera ("dragonflies"). The species is known generally as the giant darner or giant green darner.
The distribution range of Anax walsinghami includes Central America and North America.

The IUCN conservation status of A. walsinghami is least concern, with no immediate threat to the species' survival. The population is stable.

They are often found on lakes and kayaks in Canada.

References

Further reading
 Garrison, Rosser W. / Poole, Robert W., and Patricia Gentili, eds. (1997). "Odonata". Nomina Insecta Nearctica: A Check List of the Insects of North America, vol. 4: Non-Holometabolous Orders, 551-580.
 Paulson, Dennis R., and Sidney W. Dunkle (1999). "A Checklist of North American Odonata including English name, etymology, type locality, and distribution". Slater Museum of Natural History, University of Puget Sound, Occasional Paper no. 56, 88.
 Ross H. Arnett. (2000). American Insects: A Handbook of the Insects of America North of Mexico. CRC Press.

Aeshnidae
Insects described in 1883